Looe is a town in Cornwall, England, UK.

Looe may also refer to:

Geography
 Liskeard and Looe Union Canal
 Looe Island
 River Looe
 Looe Key

Other fields
 East Looe (UK Parliament constituency), constituency represented in the House of Commons of the Parliament of the United Kingdom
 Looe railway station, the terminus of a branch line from Liskeard railway station
 Looe high-level railway station, the terminus of the proposed but abandoned St Germans & Looe Railway
 Looe Valley Line, railway line from Liskeard to Looe in Cornwall, UK
 West Looe (UK Parliament constituency), constituency represented in the House of Commons of the Parliament of the United Kingdom
 HMS Looe, the name of six ships of the Royal Navy and one planned one